The Grizzlie Truth is a Canadian documentary film, directed by Kathleen Jayme and released in 2022. Following up on Jayme's 2018 film Finding Big Country, the film traces the history of the ill-fated Vancouver Grizzlies of the National Basketball Association, attempting to trace the reasons for the team's relocation to Memphis.

The film premiered on October 1, 2022, at the 2022 Vancouver International Film Festival, where it was named the winner of the Audience Award for the Galas & Special Presentations program. The film was subsequently screened at the Toronto Reel Asian International Film Festival where it won the Audience Award for best documentary. 

The film was screened in Toronto at the Hot Docs Ted Rogers Cinema on December 10, 2022, the beginning of a theatrical run in early 2023.

References

External links 
 

2022 films
2022 documentary films
Canadian sports documentary films
Canadian basketball films
Vancouver Grizzlies
English-language Canadian films
2020s Canadian films